The 2012–13 VfL Wolfsburg season was the 68th season in the club's football history. In 2012–13 the club played in the Bundesliga, the top tier of German football. It was the club's 16th consecutive season in this league, having been promoted from the 2. Bundesliga in 1997.

The club also took part in the 2012–13 edition of the DFB-Pokal, the German Cup, where it reached the semi-finals before losing to eventual champion Bayern Munich.

Review and events

Matches

Legend

Friendly matches

Bundesliga

DFB-Pokal

Squad

Squad, appearances and goals

Source:

|-
! colspan="10" style="background:#dcdcdc; text-align:center"| Goalkeepers

|-
! colspan="10" style="background:#dcdcdc; text-align:center"| Defenders

|-
! colspan="10" style="background:#dcdcdc; text-align:center"| Midfielders

|-
! colspan="10" style="background:#dcdcdc; text-align:center"| Strikers

|-
! colspan="10" style="background:#dcdcdc; text-align:center;"| No longer at club

|}

Sources

External links
 2012–13 VfL Wolfsburg season at Weltfussball.de 
 2012–13 VfL Wolfsburg season at kicker.de 
 2012–13 VfL Wolfsburg season at Fussballdaten.de 

Wolfsburg
VfL Wolfsburg seasons